Endocrine Journal is a monthly peer-reviewed medical journal covering endocrinology published by The Japan Endocrine Society. It was established in 1925 as Naibunpigaku Zasshi and renamed Nihon Naibunpigaku-kai Zasshi in 1927. In 1954 it was restarted as an English journal, entitled Endocrinologia Japonica and obtained its current title in 1993. The editor-in-chief is Itaru Kojima (Gunma University).

References

External links 
 

Publications established in 1925
Endocrinology journals
Open access journals
Monthly journals
English-language journals
Academic journals published by learned and professional societies